Arthroleptis is a genus of frogs in the family Arthroleptidae found in tropical sub-Saharan Africa. Their common names include screeching frogs, sometimes simply squeakers.

Description
These species are terrestrial breeding, with direct development (metamorphosis to froglets occurs within the egg). Many species in this genus are small, or very small, frogs with a minimum adult size of  snout-vent length. It was hypothesized that small species evolved from larger ones, but in fact the opposite seems to be case.

Arthroleptis species are terrestrial leaf-litter frogs that feed on a range of terrestrial arthropods, such as ants and termites.

Species
Forty-seven to 49 species are known; this list follows the Amphibian Species of the World:

References

 
Arthroleptidae
Amphibians of Sub-Saharan Africa
Amphibian genera
Taxa named by Andrew Smith (zoologist)